The Red Fire was a wildfire that burned in Yosemite National Park as part of the 2022 California wildfire season. The fire began on August 4, 2022 by a lightning strike and was fully out by late October. It burned 8,410 acres, much of that within the footprint of the 2001 Hoover Fire.

Along with the Rodgers Fire, which was also caused by lightning and burned concurrently in the northern portion of the park, the Red Fire is being managed by Yosemite National Park for ecological resource benefits; both fires are partially corralled by natural barriers such as granite outcrops. A third fire, the Aspen Fire, also burned in the park at the same time, in the footprint of the 2013 Rim Fire.

Impacts 
No structures were threatened or damanged by the fire, although some hiking trails in the region were temporarily closed for safety. Smoke from the fire at times caused unhealthy air quality levels within Yosemite Valley, the Central Valley, and other nearby areas.

References

2022 California wildfires
Wildfires in Madera County, California